Ida Vassalini (1 November 1891 – 21 December 1953) was an Italian teacher, philosopher, pacifist, and poet. She was born and raised in Verona, before moving to Milan to further her education. Earning a degree in philology from the University of Padua and another in philosophy from the University of Milan, Vassalini became a teacher at several high schools in and around Milan and contributed to various literary and social journals. A committed pacifist, although not a feminist, she became the head of the Milanese branch of the Women's International League for Peace and Freedom (WILPF) from 1922 to 1927, but left when the organization did not oppose the execution of Sacco and Vanzetti.

Many of Vassalini's works focused on Asian studies, in particular, translating Indian religious texts into Italian like the Upanishads, the Bhagavad Gita and the Dhammapada. She wrote poetry and literary critiques of other philosophers, including Giuseppe Rensi, Arthur Schopenhauer, and Rabindranath Tagore. Her original works produced a fusion of Eastern philosophy and Christian teachings, which mirrored her own beliefs that the Eastern and Western worlds should unite to achieve social justice. She was an anti-Communist, anti-fascist, and anti-nationalist, who believed that intellectual pursuits should not be influenced by religion or politics.

Early life and education
Ida Vassalini was born on 1 November 1891 in Verona, Italy, to Itala (née Abati) and Bartolomeo Vassalini. She studied at the Liceo Maffei, gaining an interest in classical and oriental philology, literature, and philosophy. One of her instructors, Antonio Belloni, encouraged her to write poetry. After completing high school, she went on to study philology at the University of Padua and earned a second degree in philosophy from the University of Milan. Her instructors, philosophers Piero Martinetti and Giuseppe Rensi, encouraged her to study Eastern philosophy.

Career
Upon finishing her schooling, Vassalini began working as a philosophy teacher in Milan. She wrote articles in support of pacifism for the journal  (International Life). Vassalini supported European integration and internationalism, including the policies advocated by diplomat Carlo Sforza. Another influence was her friendship with the political activist and anti-fascist Aldo Capitini.

In 1919, Vassalini joined the Women's International League for Peace and Freedom (WILPF), and became the chair of the Milanese chapter in 1922. She was chosen as the Italian delegate to the 1924 WILPF Congress held in Washington, D.C., but because of illness could not attend and was replaced by Virginia Tango Piatti. She was also unable to attend the 1926 WILPF Congress held in Paris. Instead, she sent a long missive advocating for world disarmament. She wrote to Madeleine Doty, general secretary of the International WILPF branch, explaining the difficulties of organizing and meeting with other pacifists because of the oppressive and intolerant political environment of the fascist regime. She left organization in 1927 because WILPF had refused to oppose the execution of Sacco and Vanzetti and press for international legislation against the death penalty.

Vassalini was uncompromising in her values. Although she was a member of WILPF, she supported neither feminist nor communist positions, believing men and women were not antagonists or equal in all respects. Instead, she saw all people as companions who should work together in the name of social justice. The answers to solving life's mysteries, according to Vassalini, depended on uniting the East with the West. Her decision also meant that her ability to publish was curtailed and she was isolated from other activists who found her positions too rigid and were fearful of openly opposing the regime. When the society elected her as deputy librarian, Vassalini refused to serve because she was not living in Verona.

Works
Vassalini published a pedagogical children's textbook  (We Listen to the Children) in 1921.
Her most important works were in regard to her Asian studies. Theologian Romano Guardini recognized her ability to fuse the philosophy of Indian masters and Christian teachings. In 1920, she published "" ("Note to Kalidasa") regarding poetic interpretation of poet Kalidasa's works. Three years later, Vassalini translated Rabindranath Tagore's 1917 work "Nationalism in India", which condemned nationalism as contrary to cooperation and brotherhood. Her article "" ("The One and the Many"), published in 1929, analyzed passages from the Upanishads. Between 1933 and 1945, she worked on translating portions of the Bhagavad Gita from Sanskrit and after their publication, she translated the Tat Tvam Asi, and the Dhammapada from the Pali language. 

Her article "" ("To Be and Not To Be", 1920) was a critique of interpretations of Arthur Schopenhauer's work. "" ("Pacifism and Skepticism – Re-reading the Outlines of Skeptical Philosophy"),  was written as a critical dialogue with her teacher Rensi's 1917 work. She later wrote two other works responding to his teachings. "" ("The Skepticism of Giuseppe Rensi", 1941) was a complete evaluation of his body of work and "" ("Towards a Supreme Occult Harmony?, 1952) was a retrospective rethinking of his philosophy.

Death and legacy
Vassalini died on 21 December 1953, in Milan. She is remembered for her work in support of universal freedom and justice. After her death, scant attention was paid to her work until the twenty-first century.

Notes

References

Citations

Bibliography

 
 

1891 births
1953 deaths
Writers from Verona
Italian educators
Italian pacifists
Italian philosophers
Italian women poets
University of Padua alumni
University of Milan alumni
Women's International League for Peace and Freedom people
20th-century Italian women writers
20th-century Italian poets
Italian philologists
Women philologists
Italian translators
Translators from Sanskrit
Italian Indologists